Bardo is a surname. Notable people with the surname include:

Clinton L. Bardo (1868–1937), American businessman
John Bardo (1948–2019), American educator
Natalia Bardo (born 1988), Russian actress, singer and TV host
Robert John Bardo (born 1970), American criminal
Stephen Bardo (born 1968), professional basketball player